The 1st Cavalry Corps was a cavalry corps in the Imperial Russian Army.

Part of
12th Army: 1915
1st Army: 1915
2nd Army: 1915
1st Army: 1915–1916
5th Army: 1916–1917

Commanders
Lieutenant General A. V. Novikov: 1914–1915
General V. A. Oranovsky: 1915–1917
Lieutenant General książę A. N. Dolgorukov: 1917
Lieutenant General M. A. Svieczin: 1917

References

 A.K. Zalesskij, I mirowaja wojna. Prawitieli i wojennaczalniki, wyd. WECZE, Moskwa 2000.

Cavalry units and formations
Corps of the Russian Empire
Military units and formations disestablished in the 1910s